Akapnou is a village in the Limassol District of Cyprus, located  east of Eptagoneia. , it had a population of 20.

Gallery

References

Communities in Limassol District